Elachorbis is a genus of minute sea snails or micromolluscs, marine gastropod molluscs in the family Tornidae.

Taxonomy 

The exact placement of this genus has long been contested.

Tom Iredale established Elachorbis in 1914 within the family Liotiidae. Cotton (1945) also classified Elachorbis within the family Liotiidae. Powell (1979) and ITIS (2011) classified Elachorbis within the family Cyclostrematidae (which is a synonym of Liotiidae).

Various authors have classified this genus in the Skeneidae, which is now the Skeneinae, a subfamily within the Turbinidae.

The genus Elachorbis is sometimes referred to the subfamily Vitrinellinae within the family Tornidae. However, Elachorbis is also sometimes considered to be a synonym of Circulus; Circulus is the type genus of the subfamily Circulinae within the Tornidae.

Species
Species within the genus Elachorbis include:
 Elachorbis diaphana Finlay, 1924
 Elachorbis subtatei (Suter, 1907)
 Elachorbis tatei (Angas, 1878) - type species of the genus Elachorbis - synonyms: Cyclostrema tatei Angas, 1878; Circulus tatei (Angas, 1878)

References

Tornidae
Extant Oligocene first appearances